Chaphu  is a 2019 Indian Meitei language film written and directed by Satyajit BK and produced by R.K. Bikramjit. It is a realistic thriller movie based on rituals, beliefs and black arts. The movie was premiered at Bhagyachandra Open Air Theatre (BOAT), Palace Compound, on 27 October 2019. It won the Best Actor in a Leading Role - Female, Best Actor in a Supporting Role - Male and Best Special Effect Awards at the 13th Manipur State Film Festival 2020.

Synopsis
Different groups of people have their ethnic culture, rituals and beliefs. The art of witch craft and voodoo has long been associating with the human since time immemorial. Even as the advancement of science is at its height, these phenomenons of voodoo are not able to be wiped out rather than saying that it is a form of superstition. Till today, many are practising the art of witch craft. There are many yarns that have been continuing in oral form from generation to generation, which many believe to be true. It is not that there are many who do not believe in this matter. Believing these crafts remain within one as such may be decided to be true or not when it happens personally to one.

Thanil tried to find whether the voodoo really exists or not. The homestead land of Thoiba was the cause to create enmity between Thoiba and his uncle. The uncle removed a cadaver of a baby that was entombed by putting it within a pitcher and cast the evil by practicing voodoo and caused a lot of trouble of which Thoiba's wife became insane. Thoiba who does not believe voodoo consulted physicians for treatment of his wife. The syndrome is relieved sometimes but it restarted again. Sometimes, fraud shaman swindled them to extort money from them. At last, in an effort to find the truth of the entity, Thanil tried to help the family of Thoiba to exercise the evil form Leihao. Within the trial of the three years, Thanil began to believe the art of voodoo with many strange incidents. Leihao was never relieved from the insanity and she went astray.

Cast
 Bala Tensubam as Leihao
 Bobo Ningthoukhongjam as Thoiba
 Gurumayum Priyogopal as Thanil Maiba
 Idhou
 Deepak Mutum as Nongyai
 Devan
 Chiranjit

Accolades
Chaphu won three awards at the 13th Manipur State Film Awards 2020. It also earned four nominations at the 9th MANIFA 2020.

Soundtrack
Tenao HD composed the soundtrack for the film and Satyajit BK wrote the lyrics. The song is titled Epaang Kana Yaodana.

References

2010s Meitei-language films
Meitei folklore in popular culture
2019 films